The FIS Ski Jumping World Cup is the world's highest level of ski jumping and the FIS Ski Flying World Cup as the subdivisional part of the competition. It was founded by Torbjørn Yggeseth for the 1979/80 season and organized by the International Ski Federation. Women began competing during the 2011/12 season.

The rounds are hosted primarily in Europe, with regular stops in Japan and rarely in North America. These have been hosted in 20 countries around the world for both men and women: Austria, Bosnia, Canada, Czech Republic, Finland, France, Germany, Italy, Japan, Kazakhstan, Norway, Poland, Romania, Russia, Slovakia, Slovenia, South Korea, Sweden, Switzerland and the United States.

Summer Grand Prix is the top level summer competition on plastic. The lower competitive circuits include the Continental Cup, the FIS Cup, the FIS Race and the Alpen Cup.

Global map of all world cup hosts
The maps display all 64 locations around the globe that have hosted World Cup events for men (57) and women (20) at least one time in the history of the competition. Pyeongchang in 2017 was the latest new host.

 Four Hills Tournament (1979– )
 Nordic Tour (1997–2010); Raw Air (2017– )
 Swiss Tour (1980–1992)
 Bohemia Tour (1981–1994)
 Nordic Tour (1997–2010)
 FIS Team Tour (Oberstdorf included, 2009–2013)

Scoring system 
Each season consists of 25–30 competitions, usually two competitions on the same hill during a weekend. One competition consists of a qualifying round; first round, with 50 competitors; and second round, with 30. Qualifying round for the main event was introduced in 1990 to limit the number of competitors. The top 30 in the first round advance to the second round, which is held in reverse order, so the best jumper in the first round jumps last. The aggregate score in the first and second rounds determine the competition results. The top 30 are awarded World Cup points. The winner gets 100 points while number 30 receives 1 point. At team events only top 8 receive points.

Men's Individual

Women's Individual

Men's team

Women's team

Mixed team

Men's standings
The table below shows the three highest ranked jumpers each year.

Overall

Nations Cup

Ski Flying

Ski Jumping (JP) Cup 

*This additional title was awarded from 1996 to 2000 for the best individual normal and large hill results only.The winner received a small Crystal Globe. This title was distinct from the overall WC, which included ski flying.

Titles Overall:

Nations Cup:

Ski Flying:

Men's tournaments 

There are other tournaments as part of the World Cup:

K.O.P. International Ski Flying Week

Nordic Tournament

Raw Air

Planica7

Swiss Tournament

Bohemia Tournament

FIS Team Tour

Willingen Five (2018–2020) / Six (2021)

Titisee-Neustadt Five

Women's standings

Overall

Raw Air

Russia Tour Blue Bird

Alpenkrone

Nations Cup

Lillehammer Triple

Silvester Tournament

Titles

Overall

Ski Flying

Ski Jumping (JP) Cup

Men's general statistics

Wins 

update: 19 March 2023

Podiums

Top ten appearances

Ski flying section

Wins

Podiums

Top ten appearances 

update: 19 March 2023

Women's statistics

Wins

Podiums

Wins per season

Podiums per season

Consecutive wins

Average points per season 

As of 15 March 2023

Team events

Individual team wins 
(includes team, super team & mixed-team events)

Men's team

Men's super team

Ladies' team

Mixed team

Women's super team 

updated: 19 February 2023

Various

Youngest winners

Oldest on podium

Consecutive wins

Consecutive podiums

Highest overall advantage

Most points in a season

Youngest on podium

Individual starts

Oldest winners

Podiums in a season

Average points per competition

Most points in a ski flying season

Overall leader by total events

Ski flying leader by total events

Wins in a season 

updated: 19 March 2023

World Cup winners by nations 
The table below lists those nations which have won at least one World Cup race (current as of 19 March 2023).

Men 

after 1084 individual events (13 double wins).

Men's team 

after 117 men's team events.

Women's super team 

after 1 women's super team event.

Women 

after 208 individual events (2 double wins).

Women's team 

after 8 women's team events.

Mixed 

after 7 mixed events.

Men's super team 

after 2 men's super team events.

Hosts

Men

Mixed

Men's super team

Women

Men's team

Women's team

Women's super team 

updated: 19 March 2023

Timeline calendar 

Last updated: 19 March 2023

World Cup finals

Men

Women

World Cup all-time records 
Men 

Women

update: 1 January 2023

One country podium sweep

Men

Women

Shared wins

Men

Women

Key people 
Torbjørn Yggeseth was a founder of World Cup in 1979. A new function race director was established in 1988 by International Ski Federation, with its first director Niilo Halonen then called FIS coordinator for ski jumping. Before that season this function didn't exist. In the premiere Women's 2011/12 World Cup season Chika Yoshida was entitled as World Cup Coordinator, but since the season 2012/13 Yoshida is called Race Director.

Men 

Race director assistants
 Miran Tepeš (1999–2016)
 Borek Sedlák (2016–present)
Equipment control
 Sepp Gratzer (1992–2021)
 Mika Jukkara (2021–2022)
 Christian Kathol (2022–present)

Women 

Race director assistants
 Aga Baczkowska (2012–2014)
 Borek Sedlák (2014–2016)
 Miran Tepeš (2016–present)
Equipment control
 Aga Baczkowska (2014–present)

Notes

See also
FIS Nordic World Ski Championships

References

External links

 
Jumping
Recurring sporting events established in 1979
Skiing world competitions
Ski jumping competitions
Ski jumping